The F.E. Haley Double House, also known as the Gordon Apartments, is a historic building located in Des Moines, Iowa, United States.  This double house is significant as being one of the first of this kind of building type built in the Des Moines area.  The double house was developed in this area starting in the Victorian era.  This 2½-story, brick Colonial Revival was built in 1897 by Felix E. Haley.  He managed the building, but never lived here, suggesting he had it built for rental/investment purposes.  The building features a symmetrical facade, brick in several colors and textures, and a sloping flat roof.  While it originally had a full-length front porch, this one is not the original.  The four lunette-shaped windows in the frieze feature shield-shaped panes.   The house was listed on the National Register of Historic Places in 1998.

References 

Houses completed in 1897
Colonial Revival architecture in Iowa
Houses in Des Moines, Iowa
National Register of Historic Places in Des Moines, Iowa
Houses on the National Register of Historic Places in Iowa